Raymond Earl Pinney Jr. (born June 29, 1954) is a former American football offensive tackle and guard who played in the National Football League (NFL) seven seasons with the Pittsburgh Steelers. He was selected by the Steelers in the second round of the 1976 NFL Draft and started for them during their Super Bowl XIII victory. He also spent three seasons in the United States Football League (USFL).

Professional career

Pittsburgh Steelers
 

Pinney was selected in the second round of the 1976 NFL Draft (37th overall) by the two-time defending Super Bowl champion Pittsburgh Steelers.  He played college football at the University of Washington in Seattle under head coaches Jim Owens and Don James and was a team captain for the Huskies in 1974 

As a rookie in 1976, Pinney was a backup tackle and appeared in 14 regular season games.  he played in 14 regular season games with two starts. Pinney earned the start at right tackle in Super Bowl XIII in January 1979 over Larry Brown, who had been the starter the majority of the season. He earned his first Super Bowl ring in the  victory over the Dallas Cowboys. Pinney missed the entire 1979 season due to injuries. Although he was on the roster, he sat in the stands at the Rose Bowl during the Super Bowl XIV, a  victory over the Los Angeles Rams.

Pinney returned in 1980 but changed position as Brown had solidified himself as the starting right tackle in his absence; he started all 16 regular season games in 1980 at left guard. He began the 1981 season as the Pittsburgh's starting left tackle, winning the job over longtime starter Jon Kolb, and had 11 starts and appeared in all 16 games. During the 1982 season, Pinney started all nine games at left tackle.

Michigan Panthers
With the upstart USFL coming in fruition, Pinney was targeted along with other Steeler players. He signed with the Michigan Panthers after they had offered him twice his previous salary. He played offensive tackle for them and helped them win the USFL Championship

Oakland Invaders
After the 1984 season, the Michigan Panthers merged with the Oakland Invaders. Pinney played the 1985 season (spring) with the Invaders until the USFL ceased operations.

Return to Pittsburgh Steelers
After the USFL folded, Pinney returned to the Pittsburgh Steelers; he cited he was brought back because the Steelers knew he could play and he wasn't a locker room distraction. He resumed his starting left tackle duties from three years earlier and played in 15 games with 11 starts in 1985 and started fifteen games in 1986. In his last season in 1987 at age 33, Pinney played in six games and was hampered by injuries. He had announced that he cleared out his locker at the end of the season, and Steelers' owner  notified him by phone that his contract would not be renewed.

References

External links
 

1954 births
Living people
American football offensive tackles
Washington Huskies football players
Pittsburgh Steelers players
Michigan Panthers players
Oakland Invaders players
Players of American football from Washington (state)